Nogueiró e Tenões is a civil parish in the municipality of Braga, in the Portuguese district of the same name. It was formed in 2013 by the merger of the former parishes Nogueiró and Tenões. The population in 2011 was 5,129, in an area of 4.43 km².

Architecture
 Bom Jesus do Monte
 Bom Jesus funicular
 Saint Eulália Church

References

Freguesias of Braga